The Ring magazine was established in 1922 and has since named an Upset of the Year since 1970. The award, based on the magazine's writers' criteria, is given to a fight that resulted in an outcome that was highly contrary to general expectations.

Upsets of the Year by decade

1970s

 1970 Billy Backus KO 4  Jose Napoles
 1971 Alfredo Marcano KO 10  Hiroshi Kobayashi
 1972 Esteban De Jesús W 10  Roberto Durán
 1973 Ken Norton W 12  Muhammad Ali – see also Muhammad Ali vs. Ken Norton
 1974 Muhammad Ali KO 8  George Foreman – see also The Rumble in the Jungle
 1975 John H. Stracey KO 6  Jose Napoles
 1976 Wilfred Benítez W 15  Antonio Cervantes
 1977 Jorge Luján KO 10   Alfonso Zamora
 1978 Leon Spinks W 15  Muhammad Ali – see also Muhammad Ali vs. Leon Spinks
 1979 Vito Antuofermo D 15  Marvin Hagler

1980s

 1980 Yasutsune Uehara KO 6  Samuel Serrano
 1981 Roger Stafford W 10  Pipino Cuevas
 1982 Kirkland Laing W 10  Roberto Durán
 1983 Gerrie Coetzee KO 10  Michael Dokes – see also Michael Dokes vs. Gerrie Coetzee
 1984 Gene Hatcher TKO 11  Johnny Bumphus
 1985 Michael Spinks W 15  Larry Holmes
 1986 Lloyd Honeyghan RTD 6  Donald Curry
 1987 Sugar Ray Leonard W 12  Marvelous Marvin Hagler
 1988 Iran Barkley TKO 3  Thomas Hearns – see also Thomas Hearns vs. Iran Barkley
 1989 Rene Jacquot W 12  Donald Curry

1990s

 1990 James Douglas KO 10  Mike Tyson – see also Mike Tyson vs. Buster Douglas
 1991No award given
 1992 Azumah Nelson KO 8  Jeff Fenech
 1993 Simon Brown KO 4  Terry Norris
 1994 Vuyani Bungu W 12  Kennedy McKinney
 1995 Willy Salazar KO 7  Danny Romero
 1996 Evander Holyfield TKO 11  Mike Tyson – see also Mike Tyson vs. Evander Holyfield
 1997 Vince Phillips KO 10  Kostya Tszyu
 1998 Ivan Robinson W 10  Arturo Gatti
 1999 Willy Wise W 10  Julio César Chávez

2000s

 2000 José Luis Castillo W 12  Stevie Johnston
 2001 Hasim Rahman KO 5  Lennox Lewis – see also Lennox Lewis vs. Hasim Rahman
 2002 Juan Carlos Rubio W 10  Francisco Bojado
 2003 Corrie Sanders ТKO 2  Wladimir Klitschko – see also Wladimir Klitschko vs. Corrie Sanders
 2004 Glen Johnson KO 9  Roy Jones Jr. – see also Glen Johnson vs. Roy Jones Jr.
 2005 Zahir Raheem W 12  Erik Morales
 2006 Carlos Manuel Baldomir W 12  Zab Judah
 2007 Nonito Donaire KO 5  Vic Darchinyan
 2008 Bernard Hopkins W 12  Kelly Pavlik – see also Bernard Hopkins vs. Kelly Pavlik
 2009 Juan Carlos Salgado KO 1  Jorge Linares

2010s

 2010 Jason Litzau W 10  Celestino Caballero
 2011 Nobuhiro Ishida KO 1  James Kirkland
 2012 Sonny Boy Jaro TKO 6  Pongsaklek Wonjongkam
 2013 Marcos Maidana W 12  Adrien Broner – see also Adrien Broner vs. Marcos Maidana
 2014 Chris Algieri W 12  Ruslan Provodnikov
 2015 Tyson Fury W 12  Wladimir Klitschko – see also Wladimir Klitschko vs. Tyson Fury
 2016 Joe Smith Jr. TKO 1  Andrzej Fonfara
 2017 Sadam Ali W 12  Miguel Cotto
 2018 Cristofer Rosales TKO 9  Daigo Higa
 2019 Andy Ruiz Jr. TKO 7  Anthony Joshua – see also Anthony Joshua vs. Andy Ruiz Jr.

2020s

2020 Teófimo López W 12  Vasiliy Lomachenko – see also Vasiliy Lomachenko vs. Teófimo López
2021 George Kambosos Jr W 12  Teófimo López – see also Teófimo López vs. George Kambosos Jr.
2022 Jai Opetaia W 12  Mairis Briedis

References

External links

Boxing awards
Upsets of the year